"Gessekai" (月世界) (English: Moon World) is the fifteenth single released by the Japanese rock band Buck Tick, released on May 13, 1998. The song "Gessekai" was used as opening theme of the anime Nightwalker: The Midnight Detective. Track three is a remix of "Muchi no Namida" from Sexy Stream Liner done by Tomoyasu Hotei.

Track listing

Musicians
 Atsushi Sakurai - voice
 Hisashi Imai - guitar, voice
 Hidehiko Hoshino - guitar
 Yutaka Higuchi - bass
 Toll Yagami - drums
 Kazutoshi Yokoyama - keyboard

References

1998 singles
Buck-Tick songs
Anime songs
1998 songs
Mercury Records singles
Songs with lyrics by Atsushi Sakurai
Songs with music by Hisashi Imai